Carol Partoș (also Charles Partos; 10 August 1936 — 2015) was a Romanian and Swiss chess International Master (1975), Romanian Chess Championship winner (1972).

Biography
From the mid-1960s to the mid-1970s, Carol Partoș was one of the leading Romanian chess players. Three times he won medals of Romanian Chess Championships: gold (1972), silver (1966) and bronze (1965).

Carol Partoș achieved several successes in international chess tournaments: shared 3rd place in Bucharest (1975), 1st place (1978) and shared 3rd place (1979) in Biel Chess Festival.

Carol Partoș emigrated to the Switzerland in the mid-1970s. In 1975, he was awarded the FIDE International Master (IM) title.

Carol Partoș played for Romania and Switzerland in the Chess Olympiads:
 In 1972, at second reserve board in the 20th Chess Olympiad in Skopje (+5, =3, -2),
 In 1974, at first reserve board in the 21st Chess Olympiad in Nice (+4, =4, -3),
 In 1982, at fourth board in the 25th Chess Olympiad in Lucerne (+5, =2, -4),
 In 1986, at fourth board in the 27th Chess Olympiad in Dubai (+2, =4, -3).

Carol Partoș played for Romania in the World Student Team Chess Championship:
 In 1958, at second reserve board in the 5th World Student Team Chess Championship in Varna (+3, =2, -0) and won individual gold medal,
 In 1965, at fourth board in the 12th World Student Team Chess Championship in Sinaia (+5, =3, -1).

Carol Partoș played for Romania in the Men's Chess Balkaniads:
 In 1972, at fifth board in the 4th Men's Chess Balkaniad in Sofia (+2, =0, -2) and won team bronze and individual bronze medals,
 In 1973, at fourth board in the 5th Men's Chess Balkaniad in Poiana Brașov (+3, =1, -0) and won team silver and individual gold medal,
 In 1974, at third board in the 6th Men's Chess Balkaniad in Poreč (+0, =1, -1) and won team silver and individual bronze medal,
 In 1975, at fifth board in the 7th Men's Chess Balkaniad in Istanbul (+1, =3, -0) and won team bronze and individual bronze medal.

References

External links

Carol Partoș chess games at 365chess.com

1936 births
2015 deaths
Swiss chess players
Romanian chess players
Chess International Masters
Chess Olympiad competitors